Robert H. Matz (July 8, 1912 – March 28, 2003) was an American animator. He worked on various animated shorts, films, and television projects, such as Looney Tunes, Merrie Melodies, The Pink Panther, Peanuts Cartoons, and The Transformers: The Movie.

Filmography

1957
 Crusader Rabbit (TV series) (13 episodes)
 Three Little Bops (short)

1960-1961
 The Bugs Bunny Show (TV series) (2 episodes)
 Episode #1.18 (1961)
 Episode #1.2 (1960)

1961
 Prince Violent (short)
 The Last Hungry Cat (short)
 The Pied Piper of Guadalupe (short)

1962
 Crows' Feat (short)
 Honey's Money (short)
 Mexican Boarders (short)
 Quackodile Tears (short)
 Shishkabugs (short)
 The Jet Cage (short)

1963
 Chili Weather (short)
 Devil's Feud Cake (short)
 Mexican Cat Dance (short)
 Philbert (Three's a Crowd) (short)
 The Pink Panther (main tiles - uncredited)
 The Unmentionables (short)

References

External links

1912 births
2003 deaths
American animators
Warner Bros. Discovery people
Warner Bros. people
Warner Bros. Cartoons people